Ben Azzouz is a district in Skikda Province, Algeria, on the Mediterranean Sea, it is one of the less densely populated districts of the province. It was named after its capital, Ben Azzouz.

Municipalities
The district is further divided into 3 municipalities:
Ben Azzouz
El Marsa
Bekkouche Lakhdar

Districts of Skikda Province